KDRO (1490 AM, "Newsradio 1490") is a radio station licensed to serve Sedalia, Missouri, United States.  The station is owned by Benne Media and licensed to Mathewson Broadcasting Company.

KDRO broadcasts a news/talk format.

History
KDRO first signed on the air at 1490 kHz on September 13, 1939.
 
In February 1990, Sedalia Broadcasting Corporation reached an agreement to sell this station to Mathewson Broadcasting Co.  The deal was approved by the FCC on April 16, 1990, and the transaction was consummated on June 7, 1990.

In April 2006, Jim Mathewson of Mathewson Broadcasting Co. entered into a local marketing agreement with Denny Benne of Benne Broadcasting.

In Spring 2017, KDRO switched to a news/talk format.

References

External links
KDRO official website

DRO
Pettis County, Missouri
Radio stations established in 1939
1939 establishments in Missouri
News and talk radio stations in the United States